Undersea mountain ranges are mountain ranges that are mostly or entirely underwater, and specifically under the surface of an ocean. If originated from current tectonic forces, they are often referred to as a mid-ocean ridge. In contrast, if formed by past above-water volcanism, they are known as a seamount chain. The largest and best known undersea mountain range is a mid-ocean ridge, the Mid-Atlantic Ridge. It has been observed that, "similar to those on land, the undersea mountain ranges are the loci of frequent volcanic and earthquake activity".

References

 
·
Coastal and oceanic landforms
Submarine topography
Broad-concept articles